Soundtracks is a collection of soundtrack pieces from the films Quicksilver and Lorca and the Outlaws with music composed by Genesis keyboardist Tony Banks.

Reception

AllMusic's retrospective review rated more of the album's instrumental suites as mixed in quality, but dismissed the three pop songs as mediocre and "rather hookless".

Track listing
Music from the film Quicksilver

Music from the film Lorca and the Outlaws (a.k.a. Starship)

Singles
 Lorca and the Outlaws EP (September 1985)
 "Redwing"
 "You Call This Victory" By Jim Diamond and Tony Banks
 "Lion of Symmetry" By Toyah Willcox and Tony Banks

 Shortcut to Somewhere (October 1986)
 "Shortcut to Somewhere" By Fish and Tony Banks
 "Smilin' Jack Casey"
 "K2"

Quicksilver Original Soundtrack (separate release)
"Quicksilver Lightning" - Roger Daltrey
"Casual Thing" - Fiona
"Nothing at All" - Peter Frampton
"Shortcut to Somewhere" - Fish and Tony Banks
"Love Song from Quicksilver (Through the Night)" - John Parr and Marilyn Martin
"One Sunny Day/Dueling Bikes from Quicksilver" - Ray Parker Jr. and Helen Terry
"The Motown Song" - Larry John McNally  A cover version of this song was done by Rod Stewart in 1991.
"Suite Streets - From Quicksilver"
"Quicksilver Suite I/Rebirth/The Gypsy" - Tony Banks
"Quicksilver Suite II/Crash Landing" - Tony Banks.

Song notes
 A short section of Banks' music heard in the film Quicksilver did not appear on either the soundtrack album or Banks' Soundtracks album.
 Most of the tune to the track "Lorca" was reused in the song "Queen of Darkness" from the Bankstatement album (1989).
"Smilin’ Jack Casey" is available only on this album. It is not available on the Quicksilver soundtrack album.
 A section of the song "Shortcut to Somewhere" was performed live for the first time when Genesis played a special concert for the 40th anniversary of Atlantic Records in 1988. It is the only Tony Banks solo song to have been played live by the band.

Musicians
Tony Banks - bass, guitar, keyboards, vocals, producer (on all but "1")
 The Clinic - design
 John Eden - producer on (6 to 12)
 Richard James Burgess - producer on (1)
 Andy Jackson - engineer on (1)
 Chas Watkins - engineer on "Music from the film Lorca and the Outlaws (a.k.a. Starship)"

References

External links

Soundtracks (Tony Banks album)
1986 soundtrack albums
Atlantic Records soundtracks
1986 compilation albums
Atlantic Records compilation albums
Soundtrack compilation albums
Virgin Records soundtracks
Virgin Records compilation albums
Charisma Records compilation albums
Charisma Records soundtracks
Drama film soundtracks
Science fiction film soundtracks